Stability constant may refer to:
Equilibrium constant
Acid dissociation constant
Stability constants of complexes